A worm is an animal with a long cylindrical tube-like body and no limbs.

Worm, The Worm or WORM may also refer to:

Arts and entertainment

Fictional characters
 Worm, a fictional Marvel Comics character in the Savage Land Mutates group
 Worm, a fictional villain in the Kamen Rider Kabuto TV series
 WORM, a fictional character in the anime Sky Girls

Film
 Worm (2006 film), a Russian drama film
 Worm (2013 film), an American sci-fi film

Music
 The Worm, by Jimmy McGriff, 1968
 "Worm", a song by Ministry from the 2004 album Houses of the Molé
 "The Worm", a song by Audioslave from the 2005 album Out of Exile

Other uses in arts and entertainment
 Worm, a 1988 novel by John Brosnan
 Worm, The First Digital World War, a 2010 non-fiction book by Mark Bowden
 Worm (dance move), associated with breakdancing 
 Worm (web serial), self-published by John C. "Wildbow" McCrae

Business and organizations
 WORM (AM), AM radio station in Savannah, Tennessee, U.S.
 WORM-FM, FM radio station in Savannah, Tennessee, U.S.
 Worm (marketing), a market-research analysis tool 
 WORM (Rotterdam), a non-profit foundation in the Netherlands

People
 Worm (surname), includes list of people with the surname
 Dennis Rodman (born 1961), nicknamed "The Worm", an American basketball player 
 Mike Veisor (born 1952), nicknamed "Worm", a Canadian ice hockey player
 Worm Hirsch Darre-Jenssen (1870–1945), Norwegian engineer and politician
 Worm, a nickname for a junior oilfield roughneck

Computing
 Computer worm, a standalone malware computer program that replicates itself 
 Worm memory test, a type of memory test in computing
 Write once read many (WORM), a type of data storage device

Other technology
 Worm drive, a gear arrangement in which a worm meshes with a worm gear
 Worm (artillery), device used to remove unspent powder bag remnants from a cannon
 Worm, a coiled tube used to cool the vapour produced from a pot still

Other uses
 Parasitic worm, a large macroparasite
 Worm, a term for dragon, in particular in Germanic traditions
 The Worm, nickname for a former NASA insignia

See also
 Worms (disambiguation)
 Wurm (disambiguation)
 Wyrm (disambiguation)